Semiramis (minor planet designation: 584 Semiramis) is a minor planet orbiting the Sun within the main asteroid belt. Photometric observations at the Mark Evans Observatory during 2014 gave a rotation period of 5.0689 ± 0.0001 hours. This value is in close agreement with previous studies. The spectrum shows it to be a stony S(IV)-type asteroid.

References

External links
 
 

Background asteroids
Semiramis
Semiramis
S-type asteroids (Tholen)
Sl-type asteroids (SMASS)
19060115